Peter Opiyo Odhiambo (born 20 October 1966), known as Peter Odhiambo, is a retired boxer from Kenya, who competed for his native country in the Men's Light Heavyweight (– 81 kg) at the 1996 Summer Olympics. One year earlier, he captured the gold medal in his weight division at the 1995 All-Africa Games in Harare, Zimbabwe. Odhiambo is nicknamed "Dynamite".

References

External links
 

1966 births
Living people
Kenyan male boxers
Light-heavyweight boxers
Olympic boxers of Kenya
Boxers at the 1996 Summer Olympics
Commonwealth Games bronze medallists for Kenya
Commonwealth Games medallists in boxing
Boxers at the 1994 Commonwealth Games
African Games gold medalists for Kenya
African Games medalists in boxing
Competitors at the 1995 All-Africa Games
People from Nyeri County
Medallists at the 1994 Commonwealth Games